is the 2nd mini-album of Yoh Kamiyama, released independently under e.w.e. label name on October 23, 2019.

Summary 
This is Kamiyama's 2nd mini-album under his real name, and released at least 6 months after his previous mini-album, Shiawase na Otona. Kamiyama said that this mini-album is related with his previous album.

Chart 
This album reached #33 on Oricon album chart on November 4, 2019.

Track listing 
Catalog number:

 Regular Edition - KMYM-004
 CUT cover Edition - KMYM-005
 Ice Cream cover Edition - KMYM-006

References

External links 

 Yoh Kamiyama 2nd mini-album on the official web site

2019 EPs